Çukurkeşli is a  village in Yenişehir district of Mersin Province where the capital city of Yenişehir district is actually a part of Greater Mersin. The population of the village was 240 as of 2012.

References